Augusta University Health is an academic health center that manages the clinical operations associated with Augusta University. It is a health care network that offers primary, specialty and sub-specialty care in the Augusta, Georgia area and throughout the Southeastern United States.

Facilities

Augusta University Health's facilities include:
 478-bed medical center
 154-bed children's hospital
 Medical office building with more than 80 outpatient practice sites
 13-county regional Level 1 trauma center at the Critical Care Center
 Cancer center, including a freestanding outpatient clinic, radiation oncology building and the M. Bert Storey Cancer Research Building
 Convenient satellite locations, including Augusta University Medical Associates at West Wheeler, Augusta University Medical Associates at Lake Oconee, Roosevelt Warm Springs and various freestanding clinics for specialty and subspecialty care
 Augusta University Health also partners with rural hospitals across Georgia to improve access to advanced health care options.

Awards

The hospital has received several awards.

The Breast Health Center was named Augusta's only Breast Imaging Center of Excellence by the American College of Radiology in 2011.

The Kidney Transplant Excellence Award from Healthgrades was awarded in 2009 and 2010. GRMC was one of 10 kidney transplant programs to receive the distinction.

Children's Hospital of Georgia

The Children's Hospital of Georgia (CHOG) is a 154-bed academic children's hospital, and is the only children's hospital in the Augusta area. CHOG provides the highest level of neonatal intensive care and pediatric intensive care available as defined by the American Academy of Pediatrics. It is staffed by a team of pediatric specialists who deliver inpatient and outpatient care for everything from common childhood illnesses to life-threatening conditions like heart and neurological conditions and cancer.

The facility opened in 1998 as part of the Medical College of Georgia's 10 year master-plan expansion as the MCGHealth Children's Medical Center, and was renamed in 2013. The hospital is among the largest pediatric facilities in the United States.

CHOG has an award-winning Extracorporeal Membrane Oxygenation (ECMO) program, which is considered a pioneer in this area, having started the first program in the Southeast in 1985, and having been designated a Center of Excellence in 2012.

Quality improvement
In 1993, Augusta University Medical Center implemented a program in which patients and family members serve as advisers to the hospital in order to provide input that can lead to general quality improvement efforts.

See also
Medical District (Augusta, Georgia)

References

External links
  — official website
 

Hospital buildings completed in 1956
Hospitals in Augusta, Georgia
Augusta University
Academic health science centres
Trauma centers